The Pine Leaf Boys is an American Cajun and Creole band from South Louisiana, United States. Members include Wilson Savoy (accordion, fiddle, vocals), Courtney Granger (fiddle, accordion, vocals), Drew Simon (drums and vocals), Jean Bertrand (guitars), and Thomas David (bass).

Career
The band is known for playing traditional Cajun and Creole music from Southwest Louisiana, inspired by bands dating from the 1920s such as Amédé Ardoin to modern bands such as the Mamou Playboys, Jason Frey, Paul Daigle and Cajun Gold all the way up to Wayne Toups.
The Pine Leaf Boys are an "international Cajun band," performing many shows each year in Europe. The Pine Leaf Boys were invited on a U.S. State Department Tour in 2009 to the Middle East, playing music in Saudi Arabia, the UAE, and Jerusalem. The band has been nominated for three Grammy Awards. Wilson Savoy, Courtney Granger, and former member Cedric Watson appeared in season 1 episode 7 of the HBO series Treme in 2010.

Courtney Granger passed away on 18 September 2021 from a suspected blood clot related to diabetes complications.

Awards/activity
They have been nominated 4 time Grammy for "Best Cajun Album/Zydeco album.

The Pine Leaf Boys have won numerous awards, including nominations for Grammy Award for Best Zydeco or Cajun Music Album for their second album Blues de Musicien, as well as for Homage Au Passé, plus two Cajun French Music Association Awards. They have 6 world tours for US State Department.

Discography
Allons Boire un Coup: A Collection of Cajun and Creole Drinking Songs compilation, with one song performed by Pine Leaf Boys (2006) Valcour Records
La Musique (2006) Arhoolie Records
Blues de Musicien (2007) Arhoolie Records - Grammy Nominated 2007
Homage Au Passe (2009) Lionsgate Records - Grammy Nominated 2008
Live at Jazz Festival 2009 (2009) - Grammy Nominated 2009
Back Home (2010) Valcour Records - Grammy Nominated 2010
Pine Leaf Boys (2010) Valcour Records
Danser (2013) Valcour Records

See also
History of Cajun Music
List of Notable People Related to Cajun Music

References

External links

Pine Leaf Boys Website
Cajun Music essays
Cajun Music Hall of Fame and Museum
The Cajun French Music Association
CajunZydeco Net
Radio Louisiane

Musical groups from Louisiana
Cajun musicians
Arhoolie Records artists